The 1934 Hardin–Simmons Cowboys football team was an American football team that represented Hardin–Simmons University as a member of the Texas Conference during the 1934 college football season. The team compiled a 3–5–2 overall record with a conference mark of 2–2–1.

Les Cranfill was the team's head coach for the fifth year. He had played football at Hardin-Simmons and had first joined the school's coaching staff in 1926. Following three consecutive losing seasons, the school's athletic director, G.B. Sandefer, announced in January 1935 that Cranfill had resigned as head coach.

Schedule

References

Hardin–Simmons
Hardin–Simmons Cowboys football seasons
Hardin–Simmons Cowboys football